Alexei Belov (born December 9, 1986) is a Russian ice hockey goalie who is currently playing for Kristall Saratov team in Russia.

Career 
Belov began his career with Lada-2 Togliatti and joined than in 2004 to Samara CSK VVS in the Vysshaya Liga on loan. He left than in September 2008 after six years HC Lada Togliatti and signed with Mechel Chelyabinsk of the Vysshaya Liga.

International 
Belov presented Russia at 2009 Universiads.

Career statistics

References

External links

1986 births
HC CSK VVS Samara players
HC Lada Togliatti players
HC Mechel players
Living people
Russian ice hockey goaltenders